Monteixo is a mountain of Catalonia, Spain. Located in the Pyrenees, it has a height of 2905 metres.

The village of Àreu is located at the foot of the mountain.

Together with Pic de Norís (2820 m) and Lo Sentinella (2562 m), Monteixo is part of a mountain chain that surrounds Lake d'Aixeus, a glacial lake at an altitude of 2400m.

See also
Mountains of Catalonia
County of Pallars

References

Mountains of Catalonia
Mountains of the Pyrenees
Two-thousanders of Spain